Inge Zaamwani-Kamwi (born 11 November 1958 in Grootfontein, Otjozondjupa Region) is a Namibian businesswoman and presidential advisor.

She was formerly the managing director of Namdeb, the mining joint venture between the government of Namibia and De Beers corporation, since her appointment in 1999. Prior to her position at Namdeb, Zaamwani was an official in Namibia's Ministry of Mines and Energy from 1995-1998. However, she left the company in April 2015.

Education
Zaamwani studied at the United Nations Institute for Namibia (UNIN) in Zambia from 1977-1981, when she graduated with a diploma in development studies. She has also attained post graduate leadership training from INSEAD, France, the University of Cape Town and Harvard Business School (in collaboration with the University of Witwatersrand). Zaamwani is a qualified mining lawyer, having obtained her LLB (Honours) from Thames Valley University in London, and her Master in Law (LLM) from the University of Dundee, Scotland.

Career
Zaamwani began her career in 1984 as a project officer in SWAPO's Women's council in Lusaka, Zambia. She has had interests in Air Namibia and First National Bank of Namibia Holdings.

Zaamwani-Kamwi serves as the Chief Executive Officer of Namdeb at De Beers Société Anonyme.

Until June 2008, she served as the President of the Namibia Chamber of Commerce and Industry. She has been an Independent Non-executive Director at FNB Namibia Holdings Limited since January 2000. She serves as a Director of Extract Resources (Namibia) (Proprietary) Ltd. Zaamwani-Kamwi has been a Director of Extract Resources Ltd. since 3 April 2009. She serves as a Director of First National Bank of Namibia Ltd., Namdeb Property (Pty) Ltd., NamGem Diamond Manufacturing (Pty) Ltd., Diamond Board of Namibia, Fishcor and Seaflower Lobster, NOSA Namibia, Zantang Investments (Pty) Ltd. and NABCOA, XNET Trust Fund. She also serves as a Member of the Board of Namibia's premier companies, institutions and non-government organisations. She also serves as a Director of UNAM Council, Namibia Nature Foundation, Namibia Institute of Mining and Technology, Chamber of Mines Council, Junior Achievement Namibia, Vocational and Training Board, Namibia Chamber of Commerce & Industry. She is a Member of the honourable society of Lincolns Inn, London and a fellow of the Centers for Leadership and Public Values of the UCT Graduate School of Business.

On 14 August 2020, Zaamwani-Kamwi tested positive for COVID-19.

References

External links
Inge Ingenesia Zaamwani-Kamwi

1958 births
Living people
People from Grootfontein
Members of SWAPO
Namibian women in business
Namibian businesspeople
Namibian expatriates in Zambia
Alumni of the University of Dundee
Nieman Fellows

Namibian women